Hosta (syn. Funkia) is a genus of plants commonly known as hostas, plantain lilies and occasionally by the Japanese name gibōshi. Hostas are widely cultivated as shade-tolerant foliage plants. The genus is currently placed in the family Asparagaceae, subfamily Agavoideae, and is native to northeast Asia (China, Japan, Korea, and the Russian Far East). Like many "lilioid monocots", the genus was once classified in the Liliaceae. The genus was named by Austrian botanist Leopold Trattinnick in 1812, in honor of the Austrian botanist Nicholas Thomas Host. In 1817, the generic name Funkia was used by German botanist Kurt Sprengel in honor of Heinrich Christian Funck, a collector of ferns and alpines; this was later used as a common name and can be found in some older literature.

Description

Hostas are herbaceous perennial plants, growing from rhizomes which are sometimes stoloniferous, with broad lanceolate or ovate leaves varying widely in size by species from 1–18 in (3–45 cm) long and 0.75–12 in (2–30 cm) broad. The smallest varieties are called miniatures. Variation among the numerous cultivars is even greater, with clumps ranging from less than four in (10 cm) across and three in (8 cm) high to more than six ft (200 cm) across and four ft (130 cm) high. Leaf color in wild species is typically green, although some species (e.g., H. sieboldiana) are known for a glaucous waxy leaf coating that gives a blue appearance to the leaf. Some species have a glaucous white coating covering the underside of the leaves. Natural mutations of native species are known with yellow-green ("gold") colored leaves or with leaf variegation (either white/cream or yellowish edges or centers). Variegated plants very often give rise to sports that are the result of the reshuffling of cell layers during bud formation, producing foliage with mixed pigment sections. In seedlings variegation is generally maternally derived by chloroplast transfer and is not a genetically inheritable trait.

The flowers of hosta are produced on upright scapes that are woody and remain on the plant throughout winter, they are generally taller than the leaf mound, and end in terminal racemes.  The individual flowers are usually pendulous, 0.75–2 in (2–5 cm) long, with six tepals, white, lavender, or violet in color and usually scentless. The only strongly fragrant species is Hosta plantaginea, which has white flowers up to four in (10 cm) long; it is also unusual in that the flowers open in the evening and close by morning. This species blooms in late summer and is sometimes known as "August Lily".

Taxonomy
Taxonomists differ on the number of Hosta species; there may be as many as 45. Accordingly, the list of species given here may be taken loosely. The genus may be broadly divided into three subgenera. Interspecific hybridization occurs since all  the species have the same chromosome number (2n = 2x = 60); except H. ventricosa which is a natural tetraploid that sets seed through apomixis. Many cultivated hostas formerly described as species have been reduced to cultivars; these often have their names conserved, and retain Latinized names which resemble species names (e.g., Hosta 'Fortunei').

Accepted species as of July 2021:

Accepted hybrids 
 Hosta × alismifolia - Honshu
Hosta × tardiva

Cultivation

Hostas are widely cultivated, being particularly useful in the garden as shade-tolerant plants whose striking foliage provides a focal point. The plants are long-lived perennials that are winter hardy in USDA Zones 3 to 8 and recommended for heat zones 8 to 1. Though Hosta plantaginea originates in China, most of the species that provide the modern plants were introduced from Japan to Europe by Philipp Franz von Siebold in the mid-19th century originating from shady locations with more moisture than they are generally cultivated. Newer species have been discovered on the Korean peninsula as well. Hybridization within and among species and cultivars has produced numerous cultivars, with over 6,100 registered and named varieties, and perhaps as many more that are not yet registered with the American Hosta Society. Cultivars with golden- or white-variegated leaves are especially prized. Popular cultivars include 'Francee' (green leaves with white edges), 'Gold Standard' (yellow leaves with green edges, discovered by Pauline Banyai) 'Undulata' (green leaves with white centers), 'June' (blue-green leaves with creamy centers), and 'Sum and Substance' (a huge plant with chartreuse-yellow leaves). Newer, fragrant cultivars such as 'Guacamole' are also popular.

The American Hosta Society and the British Hosta and Hemerocallis Society support hosta display gardens, often within botanical gardens. Hostas are frequently exhibited at major shows such as the Chelsea Flower Show.

Cultivars

The following is a list of cultivars that have gained the Royal Horticultural Society's Award of Garden Merit.

‘Allegan Fog’ 
 'Aureomarginata' (ventricosa) 
 'Blue Angel' (sieboldiana)
’Blue Mouse Ears’ 
‘Christmas Tree’
’Cracker Crumbs’  
’Devon Green’ 
‘El Niño’ (Tardiana Group) 
‘Fire Island’
’First Frost’
 'Francee' (fortunei)<ref>{{cite web|title=RHS Plant Selector - Hosta' 'Francee' (fortunei)|url=https://www.rhs.org.uk/Plants/71683/Hosta-Francee-(fortunei)-(v)/Details | access-date=23 February 2020}}</ref> 
 'Frances Williams'
 'Golden Tiara' 
 'Halcyon' (tardiana) 
 H. fortunei var. aureomarginata 
 H. plantaginea var. japonica 
 H. sieboldiana var. elegans 
 H. undulata var. undulata 
 H. ventricosa 
 H. venusta 
 'June' (tardiana) 
 'Krossa Regal' 
’Liberty’ 
’Orange Marmalade’
’Paradise Puppet’
’Patriot’ 
’Paul’s Glory’ 
’Praying Hands’ 
’Revolution’ 
 'Royal Standard' 
 'Sagae' 
’Shining Tot’
’Stained Glass’  
 'Sum and Substance' 
’Touch of Class’ 
’Whirlwind’
 'Wide Brim' 

Toxicity
While usually grown for ornamental purposes, all species of hosta are edible, and are grown as vegetables in some Asian cultures.

However, hostas may be toxic to dogs, cats, and horses if consumed in large quantities because some contain saponins.  Symptoms include vomiting and diarrhea.

Pests and diseases

Hosta leaves and stems are eaten by deer, rabbits, slugs and snails, and the roots and rhizomes are eaten by voles, all of these can cause extensive damage to collections in gardens. Some varieties seem more resistant to slug damage, which is more prevalent later in the growing season, than others. Insect pests include vine weevils and cutworms.

Foliar nematodes, which leave streaks of dead tissue between veins, have become an increasing problem where pesticide use has decreased.

A potexvirus called 'Hosta Virus X' was first identified in Minnesota in 1996. Plants that are infected are destroyed to prevent its spread as the disease can be transmitted from plant to plant by contaminated sap. Symptoms include dark green "ink bleed" marks in the veins of yellow-colored leaves, and/or tissue collapse between veins. It can take years for symptoms to show, so symptomless plants in infected batches should also be considered infected.

Other viruses that infect Hosta include: Tomato Ringspot Virus, Impatiens Necrotic Spot Virus, Tobacco Rattle Virus, Cucumber Mosaic Virus and several unidentified viruses.

Fungal diseases that affect Hosta include: crown rot caused by Fusarium hostae''. It causes stunting and late emergence of the plants, leaf chlorosis, browning and necrosis.

References

External links

American Hosta Society
Hosta Library 17000 Hosta Photographs, Articles, and Hosta Auction
 Hosta Virus X, Kansas State University
HOSTAS Cubit (ID, Hybridizing, Sources databases; forums)
Danish Hosta Society
Plants for a Future  Descriptions (from a Western perspective) of the edibility of several species
Hosta Lists and Hosta Garden Themes Don Rawson's Hosta Lists, containing over 22,000 entries in 102 lists.

 
Garden plants
Asparagaceae genera